Dennis O'Donnell (q1 1880 – after 1908) was an English professional footballer who scored 41 goals from 167 appearances in the Football League playing as a forward for Lincoln City, Sunderland, Notts County and Bradford Park Avenue. He also played in the Southern League for Queens Park Rangers.

Football career
O'Donnell was born in Willington Quay, then in Northumberland. He made his debut for Lincoln City on 5 October 1901 in a 2–1 win at home to Middlesbrough in the Football League Second Division, and played for the club until the end of the 1904–05 season, during which he was the club's leading scorer, with 15 goals from League and FA Cup games. He then signed for First Division Sunderland. Though he scored on his First Division debut, his next goal came more than four months later, and at the end of the season he moved on to Southern League for Queens Park Rangers. After one year in London, O'Donnell returned to the Football League, spending the 1907–08 season with Notts County and the 1908–09 season at Bradford Park Avenue.

Notes
A. : O'Donnell's birth was registered in the first quarter of 1880. However, a period of 42 days was permitted between birth and registration, so he may have been born as early as mid-November 1879.

References

1880 births
Year of death missing
Place of death missing
People from Willington Quay
Footballers from Tyne and Wear
Association football forwards
Willington Athletic F.C. players
Lincoln City F.C. players
Sunderland A.F.C. players
Queens Park Rangers F.C. players
Notts County F.C. players
Bradford (Park Avenue) A.F.C. players
English Football League players
Southern Football League players
English footballers